Fassa Association (Associazione Fassa), often referred simply as Fassa, is a minor Christian-democratic political party in Trentino, Italy. The party seeks to represent the Ladin minority in the Province and especially Ladins living in Fassa Valley.

History
Fassa was formed as Fassa List (Lista Fassa) in August 2008 as a centre-right alternative to the centre-left Ladin Autonomist Union (UAL), which used to garner a large majority of Ladin votes in Fassa Valley. Its first leader was Gino Fontana, mayor of Vigo di Fassa and, formerly, provincial councillor for Daisy Civic List, a centrist party aligned with the centre-left. A year later, the List was institutionalised and became a fully fledged party under the current name.

In the 2008 provincial election the party won 0.6% of the vote (26.6% in Fassa Valley), while the UAL gained 1.2% (54.0%).

In March 2012 the party replaced its leadership during an assembly: Elena Testor was elected president and Luca Guglielmi secretary. In September 2013 Riccardo Franceschetti, mayor of Moena and leading member of the UAL, left that party in order to join Fassa.

In the 2013 provincial election the party won 0.8% of the vote (31.9% in Fassa Valley), but still lost to the UAL, which gained 1.1% (51.8%).

However, in 2015, the party prevailed over the UAL in the first Fassa community election and Testor was elected Attorney General.

In the 2016 Italian constitutional referendum won Fassa supported the No  with 57.9% against the UAL supported Yes in Fassa Valley.

In the 2018 general election Testor, affiliated to Forza Italia, was elected to the Italian Senate from the single-seat constituency of Pergine Valsugana.

Electoral results
Results are expressed in %.

Leadership
President: Anita Santuari (2009–2012), Elena Testor (2012–present)
Secretary: Riccardo Cociardi (2009–2012), Luca Guglielmi (2012–present)

References

External links 
 Official website

Political parties in Trentino
Ladinia
Christian democratic parties in Italy
Catholic political parties
Political parties of minorities